Albert W. Hilchey was an expert on the revenue stamps of South America and Liberia. He collected during a period when revenue stamps were not well appreciated in the philatelic world and produced several important stamp catalogues of neglected areas. His The Revenue Stamps of the Dominican Republic was the first catalogue of its type since Walter Morley's work of 1904. His 1966 Guatemala Fiscal Handbook was privately produced and circulated and formed the basis for James C. Andrews' posthumously published work of the same name published by the International Society of Guatemala Collectors in 2000 after completion by Cecile Gruson. In 2010 Clive Akerman produced a new edition of Hilchey's 1968 The Revenue Stamps of Bolivia.

Hilchey's stamp collection was sold by Robson Lowe in sales of 28 November 1974 and 3 April 1975. Much of the material was acquired by Nathan E. Bruckheimer.

Selected publications
Catalog of the Telegraph Stamps of Guatemala, 1964. (Privately produced and circulated draft catalog.)
Guatemala Fiscal Handbook. 1966. (Privately produced and circulated) (Revised edition with James C. Andrews 1969)
Catalogue of the Revenue Stamps of Liberia. San Diego: 1966.
The Revenue Stamps of Bolivia. San Diego: 1968. (Updated 1974)
--do.--Lydbrook: Clive Akerman, 2010. (with Clive Akerman)
The Revenue Stamps of the Dominican Republic. San Diego: 1968.

References

Year of birth unknown
Year of death unknown
Revenue stamps
American philatelists
Philately of Bolivia
Philately of Guatemala